The Minister of Agriculture and Food Security of Malaysia is Mohamad Sabu, since 3 December 2022. Mohamad is assisted by Deputy Minister. The Minister administers the portfolio through the Ministry of Agriculture and Food Security.

List of ministers of agriculture
The following individuals have been appointed as Minister of Agriculture, or any of its precedent titles:

Political Party:

List of minister of food security
The following individuals have been appointed as Minister of Food Security, or any of its precedent titles:

Political Party:

List of ministers of food industries
The following individuals have been appointed as Minister of Food Industries, or any of its precedent titles:

Political Party:

List of ministers of agro-based Industry
The following individuals have been appointed as Minister of Food Industries, or any of its precedent titles:

Political Party:

List of ministers of fisheries 
The following individuals have been appointed as Minister of Fisheries, or any of its precedent titles:

Political Party:

References 

 
Ministry of Agriculture and Food Industries (Malaysia)
Lists of government ministers of Malaysia
Malaysia
Malaysia
Malaysia